Cesar Yatco Alzona (September 15, 1926 – June 27, 1997) (born Cesar, a.k.a. Caesar, Caezar) Laguna, Philippines, was the author of the original first Philippine Marines Hymn. He also authored another Marine-themed song, entitled "First to Fight." He served valiantly and received much praise as a military leader in the Marine Corps of the Philippine Navy against Muslim terrorists and Islamic insurgents in the southern island of Mindanao during the early years of Philippine independence from the United States in the 1950s. He was also one of the Filipino military personnel of the Korean war.

Personal life
He was sent to attend the professional United States Marine Corps TBS at Quantico, Virginia, USA. As part of the Philippine Military and Diplomatic Corps in Washington DC at the time, married to socialite Esperanza Soldevilla Cornejo, daughter of prominent Philippine legislator, Miguel R. Cornejo,[3] he established his family there with children Augustus Caesar, Eduardo, Cezarina Barbara and Esperanza Patricia, and made a name in public and civic service. Upon return to the Philippines and after separation, he had two common-law wives, Natividad Santos of the 1960s Bulakeña Restaurant fame, with whom he had one son, and subsequently Mary Joseline Nueva-Marilao, with whom he had an illegitimate daughter, Sandra Soraya Alzona.

Government service
In 1963 he returned to the Philippines to distinguished Philippine government service as a Deputy Assistant Minister of General Services in the cabinet of President Ferdinand Marcos and Executive Director of the Commission on National Integration (CNI) of the Philippines.  During the time of President Corazon Aquino he was the Administrator of the Senate (Batasang Pambansa Complex).  Throughout decades of government service, he belonged to the 5th Group of the Development Academy of the Philippines and he named that group the Pentacrons.  Caezar also became the Vice President of the Alumni Association of the National Defense College of the Philippines (NDCP).

He had been sent to study in Japan as a teenager, during World War II when Imperial Japan was trying to conquer Asia but subsequently returned to the Philippines as an interpreter in Japanese for the Manila War Crimes trials against Japanese War Criminals who fought against patriotic Filipinos, to include the Bataan Death March. However, to make amends with former collaborators, he joined the Philippine Ambassador to Japan Jose Laurel III who founded the Philippine Federation of Japan Alumni (PHILFEJA), but more known was Jose's younger brother, Salvador Laurel, who became Philippine Vice President alongside Corazon Aquino during the 1986 People Power Revolution. During the time of President Fidel V. Ramos, he was offered the position of Ambassador to Cambodia.

Death

He is buried at the Libingan ng mga Bayani (Cemetery of the Heroes) for national patriots, in Fort Bonifacio (formerly Fort McKinley) in Taguig, Metro Manila.

References
Scribd. Philippine Marine Corps - Drum and Bugle Team. https://www.scribd.com/doc/531066/Philippine-Marine-Corps-Drum-Bugle-Team

External links
  Scribd. Philippine Marine Corps - Drum and Bugle Team.  https://www.scribd.com/doc/531066/Philippine-Marine-Corps-Drum-Bugle-Team
 Marine Drum and Bugle Team

Filipino military personnel
Filipino songwriters
1997 deaths
1926 births
People from Laguna (province)
Musicians from Laguna (province)
Burials at the Libingan ng mga Bayani